Toomas "Tom" Arusoo (born July 22, 1948) was a Canadian competition swimmer who swam for Canada in several international meets including the 1968 Summer Olympics in Mexico City.

Early life
Tom Arusoo's parents were both competitive athletes in Estonia; his father was a national champion swimmer in long-distance freestyle, and his mother was the second-ranked tennis player in the country. They emigrated to Sweden in 1944 as refugees, where their son Toomas was born. They then emigrated to Canada, settling in Montreal.

Swimming career 
As a child, Arusoo started competitively swimming for the Montreal Athletic Association, specializing in the butterfly stroke. While in high school, he dated the granddaughter of American swimming coach Matt Mann. After watching Arusoo swim, Mann recommended him to the University of Michigan swimming coach. The university offered Arusoo a scholarship and he swam for the Michigan Wolverines swimming and diving team in National Collegiate Athletic Association (NCAA) and Big Ten Conference competition.

Arusoo first swam for Canada at the 1966 British Empire and Commonwealth Games, and then at the 1967 Pan American Games. 

At the 1968 Summer Olympics, Arusoo was a member of Canada's seventh-place 4x100-metre medley relay team, swimming the butterfly leg. He also competed in the preliminary heats of the 100 and 200-metre butterfly events, but failed to advance.

At his final international meet, the 1970 Commonwealth Games in Edinburgh, Arusoo won the gold medal in the 200-metre butterfly (2:08.97). In the 100-metre butterfly, he was part of the first-ever Canadian sweep of the podium at an international games, winning silver in 58.98 seconds and joined by gold medallist Byron MacDonald and bronze medallist Ron Jacks.

After swimming
In 1973, Arusoo married fellow Canadian Olympian swimmer Angela Coughlan. They had three daughters before the couple divorced ten years later.

Arusoo became a swimming coach at the Pointe Claire Aquatic Centre under International Swimming Hall of Fame coach George Gate, who had been the coach of the 1968 Olympic team. 

Arusoo also coached the Liquid Lightning Swim Club in Lake Orion, Michigan, and the Great Lakes Aquatics Akitas (North) swim team located in Holly, Michigan.

See also
 List of Commonwealth Games medallists in swimming (men)
 List of University of Michigan alumni

References

External links

1948 births
Living people
Swimmers from Stockholm
Canadian male butterfly swimmers
Michigan Wolverines men's swimmers
Olympic swimmers of Canada
Swimmers at the 1967 Pan American Games
Swimmers at the 1968 Summer Olympics
Swimmers at the 1966 British Empire and Commonwealth Games
Swimmers at the 1970 British Commonwealth Games
Commonwealth Games gold medallists for Canada
Commonwealth Games silver medallists for Canada
Commonwealth Games bronze medallists for Canada
Commonwealth Games medallists in swimming
Pan American Games silver medalists for Canada
Pan American Games medalists in swimming
Medalists at the 1967 Pan American Games
Medallists at the 1966 British Empire and Commonwealth Games
Medallists at the 1970 British Commonwealth Games